Gemmula parkinsonii is an extinct species of sea snail, a marine gastropod mollusk in the family Turridae, the turrids.

Description

Distribution
Fossils of this marine species have been found in Oligocene strata in Île-de-France, France.

References

 Lozouet (P.) & Maestrati (P.), 2012 -Le contenu paléontologique. Mollusques. In : Lozouet (P.) Stratotype stampien, p. 239-297

parkinsonii
Gastropods described in 1860